Polychrosis meliscia is a species of moth of the family Tortricidae. It is found in New Zealand at the Kermadec Islands.

Taxonomy
This species was first described by Edward Meyrick in 1910 using specimens collected on Raoul Island and named Polychrosis meliscia. In 1972 J. S. Dugdale referred to this species as Lobesia meliscia. But in 1988 Dugdale discussed this species under its original name Polychrosis meliscia. This placement was confirmed in 2010 by Robert Hoare in the New Zealand  Inventory of Biodiversity where the species was again discussed under the name Polychrosis meliscia. The female holotype specimen is held at the Natural History Museum, London.

Description
Meyrick described this species as follows:

Distribution 

This species is found on the Kermadec Islands.

References

Olethreutini
Moths described in 1910
Moths of New Zealand
Endemic fauna of New Zealand
Taxa named by Edward Meyrick
Fauna of the Kermadec Islands
Endemic moths of New Zealand